Ri Jin-sim  (born 29 May 1991,) is a North Korean footballer who plays as a goalkeeper for the North Korea women's national football team. She was part of the team at the 2011 FIFA Women's World Cup. At the club level, she plays for Wolmido in North Korea.

References

External links
 

1991 births
Living people
North Korean women's footballers
North Korea women's international footballers
Place of birth missing (living people)
2011 FIFA Women's World Cup players
Women's association football goalkeepers